Armand Walter (5 April 1908 – 11 July 1995) was a French gymnast. He competed in eight events at the 1936 Summer Olympics.

References

1908 births
1995 deaths
French male artistic gymnasts
Olympic gymnasts of France
Gymnasts at the 1936 Summer Olympics
Sportspeople from Haut-Rhin